Andrew Alexander Watt, JP, DL (4 November 1853 – 11 October 1928) was an Anglo-Irish landowner and businessman with a net worth of over £900,000 at his death in 1928, worth £51.8 million in 2016.

Early life
He was born in 1853 to Samuel Watt of Thornhill and his wife Jane Newman, daughter of Captain Robert Newman, R.N. He was educated at Foyle College and then at home by tutors. His family were gentry who had arrived at Claragh in County Donegal during one of the Ulster Plantations.

Career
He was the owner of Watt's Distillery, one of the largest distilleries in Ireland, and the creator of many whiskies including the famous Tyrconnell, which he named after his racehorse that won the National Produce Stakes against the odds of 100 to 1.

During industrial unrest of 1921, brought about by prohibition in the United States and the First World War, Watt's workers at the distillery were made redundant after challenging his authority. Watt is said to have stood on a barrel outside the gates to his distillery in Bogside, whilst the workers were on strike, and shouted, 'Well men, I shall put it to you like this …what is it to be? Will you open the gates?' To which the workers retorted, 'The gates stay shut!' This prompted Watt to reply, 'Shut they are, and shut they shall remain!' Watt subsequently closed down the distillery at great economic expense.

Personal life
On 7 October 1875, he married Violet Flora de Burgh, daughter of George de Burgh and Constance Matthews, with whom he had 4 sons and 2 daughters

He served as High Sheriff of County Londonderry from 1886 to 1887.

He was a member of Boodle's. He died at Easton Hall, where he lived in England after he left Ireland.

References

People educated at Foyle College
1853 births
1928 deaths
High Sheriffs of County Londonderry
Northern Ireland justices of the peace
Deputy Lieutenants of Donegal